The Six Days of Zürich was a six-day track cycling race held annually in Zürich, Switzerland. The event was first held in 1954 and the final edition was held in 2014.

Winners

References

Cycle races in Switzerland
Sport in Zürich
Six-day races
Recurring sporting events established in 1954
1954 establishments in Switzerland
Recurring sporting events disestablished in 2014
2014 disestablishments in Switzerland
Defunct cycling races in Switzerland